Sepak Takraw for the 1977 Southeast Asian Games was held at Stadium Negara and Chin Woo Stadium in Kuala Lumpur on 25 November 1977.

Results

References
 Ninth SEA Games Kuala Lumpur '77 Official Report, The Ninth Sea Games Organizing Council, 1979

Sepak takraw at the Southeast Asian Games
1977 in sports
1977 Southeast Asian Games events